Events in the year 1686 in Portugal.

Incumbents
 Monarch: Peter II

Events
 16 April – The Portuguese vessel Nossa Senhora dos Milagros with 150 crew run aground at Struisbaai near Cape Agulhas

Arts and entertainment

Sports

Births
 Ignácio Barbosa-Machado, historian (died 1734).

Deaths

References

 
Years of the 17th century in Portugal
Portugal